The Yigha language, known as Leyigha or after the people as Ayigha (Asiga), is an Upper Cross River language of Nigeria.

References

Languages of Nigeria
Upper Cross River languages